Povel Ottesen Huitfeldt (Povel Huitfeldt, Pouel Huitfeldt or Paul Huitfeldt, ca 1520 - 21 September 1592) was the first Danish-Norwegian Governor-general of Norway.

Background
He was born circa 1520.   His parents were Otte Clausen Huitfeldt til Krumstrup, Skibelundgaard og Lørup (who died between 1517 and 1529) and Barbara Eriksdatter Blaa (who died before 1558).   Christoffer Huitfeldt  (ca. 1501-1559) and  Peder Huitfeldt  (died 1584) were his brothers. On 4 February 1554 he married Margrethe Breide, the daughter of Hans Breide and Thale Emmiksdatter.

Early career
Huitfeldt was the youngest of the four Huitfeldt brothers who eventually came to Norway; around 1548 he was with his brother Christoffer, the bailiff at Bergenhus Fortress in Bergen. In the summers of 1552-54 and over the winter of 1554-55, he served as the king's representative on Iceland. Accompanied by a military force, he completed the conversion of Icelanders to the Lutheran faith after the last Catholic bishop, Jon Arason, had been executed in 1550. Huitfeldt's wife had been a lady-in-waiting to Christian III of Denmark’s Queen Dorothea, and 1556–59, Huitfeldt served as sheriff at Copenhagen Castle. In 1559-63 the widowed Queen granted him Koldinghus, the last of the ancient royal castles on Jutland, which was hers to award since she had the right to the income there as widow of a king.

Seven Years' War
As the Kalmar Union broke down, Erik XIV in Sweden and Frederik II in Denmark were at odds. On 13 August 1563, Denmark and Lübeck emissaries declared war in Stockholm. During the Northern Seven Years' War Huitfeldt was in charge of Halmstad, a port town in the then-Danish province of Halland, which he held during a siege by Swedish forces in the autumn of 1563. Danish King Fredrik II attacked the only Swedish port on the west coast, Älvsborg, advancing from Halland with an army 25,000 strong and captured Sweden's gateway to the west with three days of bombardment followed by a 6 hours assault on 4 September. This achieved the Danish aim of cutting off Sweden from the North Sea, blocking critical salt imports. Erik XIV then countered by attacking Halmstad in October, managing to breach the walls with artillery, but two assaults were beaten back.

Governor-General of Norway

Background
From the collapse of the Norwegian Royal Council in 1536/1537 as the Reformation gained a dominant position in Norway until 1572 there was no central Norwegian government to link the king in Copenhagen, the king's royal officials and the common citizens. Each feudal lord (lensherre) was the highest authority in his district and was responsible, through the Norwegian Chancellor who was in the Chancellery (Kancelli) in Copenhagen, only to the king. Since the former Norwegian Royal Council represented Norway's historic right to elect their own king, it is likely that the lack of central authority was initially promoted by the reigning Danish-Norwegian monarch. However conflicts with Sweden such at the Northern Seven Years' War (1563-1570) highlighted the weaknesses to this approach. Sweden had established a standing army, invading the Norwegian Østerdal, Hedmark and as far west as Skiensfjord. Further Sweden invested Akershus Fortress in Oslo, burned Hamar Cathedral and destroyed the bishop's fortified palace Hamarhus. Since no standing Norwegian army was maintained, districts in Norway had proven unable to defend themselves against even relatively small invading forces.

From 1572 through 1577,  Huitfeldt was the first in a long line of foreign Governors-general of Norway (stattholder), but neither the government in Copenhagen nor Huitfeldt managed to achieve the goals the ministry had established for his role. 
The statholder was given responsibility for royal property, supervision of the church and clergy, the courts, and oversight of the feudal lords so that they should not oppress their people as well as faithfully collecting the king's tax share. The lands for which he was responsible included a large number of properties since the crown had traditionally owned land and in addition had confiscated large amounts of church land during the Reformation. Although subsequent to Huitfeldt's tenure, on 5 July 1588 the statholder was also charged to be commander in chief of the Norwegian military forces.

Huitfeldt's tenure
After the war was Huitfeldt sent to Norway, where he was the feudal lord of Brunla Manor in Larvik from 1570 to 1574. In April 1572 he was also charged to serve as feudal lord for Akershus and Tromsø. On 10 May 1572 he was directed to serve as Governor-general of Norway  and serve as a judge at the lagtings in Oslo, Bergen and Trondheim. He was to hear and resolve complaints on the various provinces  and to lead and carefully control the local officials, ensure that the king's revenue was collected in a timely fashion, to investigate whether the crown goods were properly administered and supervise the administration of the Church. Huitfeldt probably contributed to Chancellor Johan Venstermand's removal that same autumn, for he was the only governor who was assigned a coordinating role over the judiciary.

Huitfeldt traveled to court meetings in Bergen and Trondheim for the first couple of years, but in 1575 he received the king's exemption from travel to Bergen. He was unable to control the local officials; Ludvig Munk and others were undisturbed their abuse of tax collections and their violent oppression of peasant resistance in Trøndelag. Further, Munk became Huitfeldt's successor as governor in 1577.

Huitfeldt activities in church administration produced better results. On his own initiative, in 1574 he appointed three officials who supervised collection of church tithes and the church economy. In addition they prepared jordebøker (a cadastral survey of the time that provides a comprehensive register of the metes-and-bounds for real property) for all ecclesiastical property in Norway. This work was printed in the Diocese of Oslo 1575 and for the Diocese of Hamar in 1577. This jordebøker collection was called Povel Huitfeldt stiftsbok; the original has been lost, but a copy from 1601 has been preserved which includes additions and corrections up to and including the year 1600. A jordebøker was also produced for the Diocese of Stavanger, the first which was completed, but it has been lost.  In other dioceses no stiftsbok was prepared and the system was abolished, in general by 1578, and in Akershus by 1581. Thus control of the economy reverted to local church officials and local bailiffs.

He also actively promoted education. Næss indicates; "Though smaller than Bergen, Oslo surpassed that city as a seat of learning, partly because of the support of the Danish governors Povel Huitfeld and Aksel Gyldenstjerne."

Huitfeldt led a 1576 meeting in Skien between delegates from the clergy and farmers in Stavanger county to mediate a conflict about the tithe, and afterwards he announced the agreement on how the tithe was to be shared. Farmers would keep the quarter of the tithe which from days of old had been used to provide for the poor, but instead they agreed to provide the funds to support the students at Stavanger Cathedral School. Diocese elsewhere continued in conflict, but what became known as Povel Huitfeldt's agreement was confirmed by the king and became the national guidance.

Retirement from service
Povel Huitfeldt pleaded health problems when in 1575 he requested and received an exemption from traveling to Bergen. He retired in 1577 from all other positions because of health problems and because travel through Norway was most difficult because of poor roads, dangerous bridges, and steep cliffs.  After retiring from service he stayed primarily in Halland, where he held property.  From 1581 forward to his death he also was feudal lord of Tromsø. He died during a stay at his nephew, Chancellor and historian Arild Huitfeldt, on the Tryggevælde manor south of Køge.
He died on 21 September 1592 at Tryggevælde Manor (on the Øresund) in Zealand. He was buried at Halmstad Church, Sweden.

References

Other sources
Gjerset, Knut (1915) History of the Norwegian People, Volumes I & II (New York City: The MacMillan Company)

Bibliography
 Dansk Biografisk Leksikon, vol. 6. Copenhagen: Gyldendal, 1979-84.
 Gyldendal og Politikens Danmarkshistorie, vol. 7. Copenhagen: Gyldendal and Politiken, 1988-93.
 S. Kolsrud (red.): Oslo og Hamar bispedømmes jordebok 1574–77, 1929
 O. A. Johnsen: biografi i NBL1, vol. 6, 1934
 H. Larsen: Povel Huitfeldt, norsk stattholder 1572–77, h.oppg. UiO, 1936
 P. Colding: Studier i Danmarks politiske historie i slutningen af Christian IIs og begyndelsen af Frederik IIs tid''', København 1939
 S. Supphellen: “Opprettinga av ein norsk statthaldarinstitusjon i 1572”, i HT, vol. 58, 1979, s. 159–175
 Ø. Rian: Den aristokratiske fyrstestaten, vol. 2 i Danmark-Norge 1380–1814'', 1997

Governors-general of Norway
16th-century Danish nobility
1520 births
1592 deaths
16th-century Danish people
16th-century Norwegian people
Huitfeldt family